Celebration Castle is the second album by American indie/garage rock band The Ponys. The band recorded it in four days in late 2004. It was released on May 3, 2005.

Track listing
All songs written by Jered Gummere, Melissa Elias, Nathan Jerde, and Ian Adams.
"Glass Conversation" – 4:19   
"Another Wound" – 3:33 
"Today" – 3:10  
"I'm with You" – 2:33   
"We Shot the World" – 4:02 
"Shadow Box" – 3:42
"Discoteca" – 2:54   
"Get Black" – 4:22   
"She's Broken" – 4:41    
"Ferocious" – 3:59

Personnel 

 Steve Albini – Engineer
 Steve Hall – Mastering

References

2005 albums
The Ponys (band) albums
In the Red Records albums
Albums produced by Steve Albini